The 1990 British Formula Three season was the 40th season of the British Formula Three Championship, starting on 1 April at Donington Park and ending on 7 October at Silverstone following 17 races.

The season was notable for its domination by future Formula One champion Mika Häkkinen and fellow Finn and future F1 driver Mika Salo; both drove Mugen-Honda-powered Ralt chassis, prepared by West Surrey Racing and Alan Docking Racing respectively. Häkkinen started the year strongly with three wins from the first four races, but Salo responded with four victories in the next six events to establish an 11-point advantage over his rival. The 11th round of the series at Snetterton proved a turning point, however, as Salo spun out while leading, allowing Häkkinen to begin a sequence of six wins from the final seven rounds which would allow him to seal the title with two rounds to spare.

Häkkinen's reward would be a deal to race with the Lotus F1 team in 1991, although Salo's career momentum was ruined by a drunk-driving charge that forced him to move to Japan to further his career. Other drivers in the field that went on to enjoy success in international motorsport included Christian Fittipaldi, who went on to win the International Formula 3000 championship the following year before enjoying stints in F1 and CART, and future touring car and sportscar driver Peter Kox.

1990 also marked the start of a dominant period for Mugen-Honda engines, which would power each British F3 champion until 2005 with only one exception. Charles Rickett won the Class B title in a year-old Volkswagen-powered Ralt.

Drivers and Teams

Race calendar and results

 Häkkinen and Salo set identical fastest lap times and were subsequently both awarded an additional point.

Championship Standings

Points in brackets include dropped scores – only the best 14 of 17 scores count towards the championship

References

External links
 The official website of the British Formula 3 Championship

Formula Three
British Formula Three Championship seasons